European Commercial Internet Exchange (ECIX) is a brand name of PEERING GmbH. The headquarters is in Berlin. PEERING GmbH is a commercial organisation operating the ECIX. There are three POP's in Germany with more than 150 members and peak traffic higher than 700Gbit/s, making it the second largest IXP in Germany by membership and traffic.  ECIX currently operates an Extreme Networks and Brocade  infrastructure with 1-100Gbit/s links.

Amsterdam 

 Telecity 2

Berlin 

 Prosite / Speedbone, Alboinkontor
 Mesh (Level 3 Communications), Gradestraße 60
 Carrier Colocation / I/P/B, Lützowstraße 105/106

Düsseldorf 

 Interxion Düsseldorf
 Mesh (Level 3 Communications)
 Fibre1/MyLoc
 Equinix

Frankfurt am Main 

 Interxion
 Equinix, Kleyerstraße
 TeleCity

Hamburg 

 Level 3 Communications
 N@twork, Wendenstraße 379, 1.OG
 GlobalConnect, Wendenstraße 379, 3.OG
 IPHH, Wendenstraße 408

References

External links
 Website of the ECIX
 traffic statistics 
 Website of PEERING
 www.ecix.net ECIX Website
 ECIX Launches First German 100GE Internet Exchange in Frankfurt

Internet exchange points in Germany